Michael Franklin "Si" Seyfrit (January 31, 1898 – September 1, 1955) was an American football player.  

A native of Carlinville, Illinois, he played college football under Knute Rockne at Notre Dame in 1920 and 1921. During his two seasons at Notre Dame, the Fighting Irish compiled a 9–0 record in 1920 and 10–1 in 1921.

He then played professional football as an end in the National Football League (NFL) for the Toledo Maroons in 1923 and the Hammond Pros in 1924. He appeared in 13 NFL games, 12 as a starter.

References

1898 births
1955 deaths
Toledo Maroons players
Hammond Pros players
Players of American football from Illinois
People from Carlinville, Illinois
Notre Dame Fighting Irish football players